Peskovi (Serbian and , Peskovi) is a mountain in the Šar Mountains range, located between Kosovo and North Macedonia.

The border line between Kosovo (to the North) and North Macedonia (to the South) goes Northeast along the Šar Mountains, passes over the triangulation point  in the area s.c. Peskovi, then turns a little Southeast-ward before moving Northeast passing over the elevation .
It is the third highest mountain in Kosovo after Velika Rudoka and Gjeravica. Several lakes are found on the Kosovan side.

Notes and references
Notes:

References:

Šar Mountains
Two-thousanders of Kosovo